Dehnow is a village in Mosaferabad Rural District, Rudkhaneh District, Rudan County, Hormozgan Province, Iran. At the 2006 census, its population was 37, in 9 families.

References 

Populated places in Rudan County